Authie is the name of several places in France:

Authie, Calvados, commune of the Calvados département
Authie, Somme, commune of the Somme département
Authie (river), a river in northern France